The United States House Committee on Appropriations is a committee of the United States House of Representatives that is responsible for passing appropriation bills along with its Senate counterpart. The bills passed by the Appropriations Committee regulate expenditures of money by the government of the United States. As such, it is one of the most powerful committees, and its members are seen as influential.

History 
The constitutional basis for the Appropriations Committee comes from Article one, Section nine, Clause seven of the U.S. Constitution, which says:
No money shall be drawn from the treasury, but in consequence of appropriations made by law; and a regular statement and account of receipts and expenditures of all public money shall be published from time to time.

This clearly delegated the power of appropriating money to Congress, but was vague beyond that. Originally, the power of appropriating was taken by the Committee on Ways and Means, but the United States Civil War placed a large burden on the Congress, and at the end of that conflict, a reorganization occurred.

Early years
The Committee on Appropriations was created on December 11, 1865, when the U.S. House of Representatives separated the tasks of the Committee on Ways and Means into three parts. The passage of legislation affecting taxes remained with Ways and Means. The power to regulate banking was transferred to the Committee on Banking and Commerce. The power to appropriate money—to control the federal purse strings—was given to the newly created Appropriations Committee.

At the time of creation the membership of the committee stood at nine; it currently has 53 members. The power of the committee has only grown since its founding; many of its members and chairmen have gone on to even higher posts. Four of them—Samuel Randall (D-PA), Joseph Cannon (R-IL), Joseph Byrns (D-TN) and Nancy Pelosi (D-CA)—have gone on to become the Speaker of the United States House of Representatives; one, James Garfield, has gone on to become President of the United States.

The root of the Appropriations Committee's power is its ability to disburse funds, and thus as the United States federal budget has risen, so has the power of the Appropriations Committee. The first federal budget of the United States, in 1789, was for $639,000—a hefty sum for the time, but a much smaller amount relative to the economy than the federal budget would later become. By the time the Appropriations committee was founded, the Civil War and inflation had raised expenditures to roughly $1.3 billion, increasing the clout of Appropriations. Expenditures continued to follow this pattern—rising sharply during wars before settling down—for over 100 years.

Another important development for Appropriations occurred in the presidency of Warren G. Harding. Harding was the first president of the United States to deliver a budget proposal to Congress.

Recent times
In May 1945, when U.S. Representative Albert J. Engel queried extra funds for the Manhattan Project, the administration approved a visit to the Clinton Engineer Works at Oak Ridge (CEW) (and one to HEW if desired) by selected legislators, including Engel, Mahon, Snyder, John Taber and Clarence Cannon (the committee chairman). About a month earlier Taber and Cannon had nearly come to blows over the expenditure but, after visiting CEW, Taber asked General Groves and Colonel Nichols "Are you sure you're asking for enough money?'' Cannon commented "Well, I never expected to hear that from you, John."

In the early 1970s, the Appropriations Committee faced a crisis. President Richard Nixon began "impounding" funds, not allowing them to be spent, even when Congress had specifically appropriated money for a cause. This was essentially a line-item veto. Numerous court cases were filed by outraged interest groups and members of Congress. Eventually, the sense that Congress needed to regain control of the budget process led to the adoption of the Congressional Budget and Impoundment Control Act of 1974, which finalized the budget process in its current form.

Role 

The Appropriations committee is widely recognized by political scientists as one of the "power committees", since it holds the power of the purse. Openings on the Appropriations committee are often hotly demanded, and are doled out as rewards. It is one of the "exclusive" committees of the House, meaning its members typically sit on no other committee. Under House Rules, an exception to this is that five Members of the Appropriations Committee must serve on the House Budget Committee—three for the majority and two for the minority. Much of the power of the committee comes from the inherent utility of controlling spending. Its subcommittee chairs are often called "Cardinals", likening them to the most senior members of the Catholic Church, because of the power they wield over the budget.

Since the House is elected from single-member districts, securing financing for projects in the district can help a member to be reelected as the funds can create jobs and raise economic performance. This type of spending is derided by critics as pork barrel spending, while those who engage in it generally defend it as necessary and appropriate expenditure of government funds. The members of the Appropriations committee can do this better than most, and better direct funding towards another member's district, increasing the stature of committee members in the House and helping them gain support for their priorities, including seeking leadership positions or other honors.

The committee tends to be less partisan than other committees or the House overall. While the minority party will offer amendments during committee consideration, appropriations bills often get significant bipartisan support, both in committee and on the House floor. This atmosphere can be attributed to the fact that all committee members have a compelling interest in ensuring legislation will contain money for their own districts. Conversely, because members of this committee can easily steer money to their home districts, it is considered very difficult to unseat a member of this committee at an election—especially if he or she is a "Cardinal".

In addition, the ability to appropriate money is useful to lobbyists and interest groups; as such, being on Appropriations makes it easier to collect campaign contributions (see campaign finance).

Jurisdiction 
The Appropriations Committee has one of the largest jurisdictions of any federal committee. Under Rule 10 of the House rules, the committee's jurisdiction is defined as:
 Appropriation of the revenue for the support of the Government
 Rescissions of appropriations contained in appropriations Acts
 Transfers of unexpected balances
 Bills and joint resolutions reported by other committees that provide new entitlement authority as defined in section 3(9) of the Congressional Budget Act of 1974 and referred to the committee under clause 4(a)(2)

Members, 118th Congress 

Resolutions electing members:  (Chair),  (Ranking Member),  (R),  (D)

Subcommittees

Reorganization in 2007
In 2007, the number of subcommittees was increased to 12 at the start of the 110th Congress.  This reorganization, developed by Chairman David Obey and his Senate counterpart, Robert Byrd, for the first time provided for common subcommittee structures between both houses, a move that both chairmen hoped will allow Congress to "complete action on each of the government funding on time for the first time since 1994".

The new structure added the Subcommittee on Financial Services and General Government, and transferred jurisdiction over Legislative Branch appropriations from the full committee to a newly reinstated Legislative Branch Subcommittee, which had not existed since the 108th Congress.

List of subcommittees

Historical rosters

117th Congress

Resolutions electing members:  (Chair),  (Ranking Member),  (D),  (R),  (D)

Subcommittees

116th Congress

Resolutions electing members:  (Chair),  (Ranking Member),  (D),  (R)

Subcommittees

115th Congress

114th Congress

113th Congress

List of chairs

See also
 2015 United States federal appropriations

References

External links

 Committee on Appropriations, U.S. House of Representatives (Archive)
 A Concise History of the House of Representatives Committee on Appropriations (December 2010)
 Appropriations Subcommittee Structure: History of Changes from 1920 to 2021 by Congressional Research Service.
 House Appropriations Committee. Legislation activity and reports, Congress.gov.
 House Appropriations Committee Hearings and Meetings Video. Congress.gov.

House Committee on Appropriations
Appropriations
 :
1865 establishments in the United States
Organizations established in 1865